The 2011 European Athletics Indoor Championships were held at the Palais Omnisports de Paris-Bercy in Paris, France, from 4 to 6 March 2011.

577 athletes representing 46 countries competed at the championships. Twenty-six track and field events were contested, with the events programme divided equally between the genders. Russia topped the medal table, having won the most gold medals (six), as well as having gained the greatest total with fifteen. The host nation, France, was the next best performing team, with five golds being won by French athletes. Germany had the third highest medal haul, followed by Great Britain.

French triple jumper Teddy Tamgho provided the highlight of the tournament with two world indoor record clearances. His compatriot Renaud Lavillenie also excelled, becoming the third best ever performer indoors in the men's pole vault, while Leslie Djhone and Antoinette Nana Djimou Ida won their events with French record marks.

Belarusian Andrei Krauchanka's national record performance won the men's heptathlon and Poland's Anna Rogowska took the women's pole vault with a national record. Portuguese runner Francis Obikwelu also had a national record-breaking win, defeating the host favourite Christophe Lemaitre in the 60 metres. The women's 3000 metres saw Briton Helen Clitheroe win her first major title at the age of 37. Ivan Ukhov of Russia attempted the world record in the high jump, but narrowly missed the clearance. The competition closed with the fifth French record of the championships as the host men's team won the 4 × 400 metres relay.

Venue
The venue for the 2011 European Athletics Indoor Championships was the Palais Omnisports de Paris-Bercy. It can hold a maximum capacity of 18,000 people and has hold several indoor athletics events in the past, including the 1985 IAAF World Indoor Games, the 1994 European Indoor Championships and the 1997 IAAF World Indoor Championships.

Ceremonies
The opening ceremony was held at 4 March 2011 at 15:00 local time. There was a short ceremony but without teams participation. The closing ceremony took place at 18:00 on the last day, 6 March 2011, and every participating team was invited.

Schedule

Men's results

Track

Field

Combined

Women's results

Track

 Original 800m champion Yevgenia Zinurova of Russia was stripped of her title and banned for two years on 3 July 2012 following a doping offence.

Field

Combined

Medal table

Participating nations

 (2)
 (5)
 (10)
 (3)
 (20)
 (16)
 (5)
 (12)
 (8)
 (3)
 (16)
 (11)
 (10)
 (13)
 (47)
 (2)
 (38)
 (2)
 (32)
 (14)
 (5)
 (2)
 (7)
 (4)
 (27)
 (7)
 (9)
 (1)
 (1)
 (2)
 (1)
 (15)
 (12)
 (18)
 (15)
 (16)
 (55)
 (1)
 (6)
 (6)
 (9)
 (34)
 (15)
 (7)
 (12)
 (25)

References

External links

Event reviews from European Athletics

 
2011
Athletics in Paris
International athletics competitions hosted by France
2011 in athletics (track and field)
2011 in French sport
March 2011 sports events in France
2011 in Paris
International sports competitions hosted by Paris